{{Infobox song
| name       = My Army of Lovers
| cover      = My_Army_of_Lovers.jpg
| alt        =
| type       = single
| artist     = Army of Lovers
| album      = Disco Extravaganza and Massive Luxury Overdose | B-side     = "Scorpio Rising"
| released   = May 1990 and July 1991
| recorded   =
| studio     =
| venue      =
| genre      = *Dance
disco
eurodance
| length     = 3:27
| label      = Ton Son Ton
| writer     = *Alexander Bard
Jean-Pierre Barda
Tim Norell
Peo Tyrén
| producer   = *Anders Hansson
Ola Håkansson
Tim Norell
| chronology = Army of Lovers
| prev_title = Ride the Bullet
| prev_year  = 1990
| next_title = Supernatural
| next_year  = 1990
| misc       = 
}}

"My Army of Lovers" is a song by Swedish dance music group Army of Lovers, released in March 1990 as the fourth single from their debut album, Disco Extravaganza (1990). The song was written by Tim Norell, Ola Håkansson, Alexander Bard, Anders Hansson and Peo Thyrén. It reuses the instrumental track of "Barbie Goes Around the World" released by the group when they were performing under the name Barbie.

Critical reception
Swedish newspaper Aftonbladet described the song as "dreamy". Larry Flick from Billboard wrote, "Pop-flavored dance nugget by Euro-trio has already scored with import-conscious folks. Shuffling hip-hop groove foundation offers sturdy support for mantra-like vocals and an infectious, radio-ready hook." Andy Kastanas from The Charlotte Observer viewed it as "a down tempo Eurobeat marvel that's somewhat reminiscent of the Imagination classic "Just an Illusion" with steamy French female vocals that'll soften you up for the kill." A reviewer from Music & Media'' commented, "Army of Lovers combine some pretty heavy grooves with sultry vocals by singer La Camilla, along with Arabian chants. The record has that exotic something extra which makes a song worthwhile. Yet another strong, innovative track from Scandinavia."

Music video
The accompanying music video for "My Army of Lovers" won the Swedish 1991 Grammis award for best music video.

Single track listing

 7" single (Sweden, 1990)
My Army of Lovers (Album Version) - 3:27
Scorpio Rising (Album Version) - 4:33

 7" single (France, 1990)
My Army of Lovers - 3:27
Ride the Bullet - 4:20

 12" maxi-single (Sweden, 1990)
My Army of Lovers (Tour Du Monde Club Mix) - 7:02
My Army of Lovers (Radio Edit) - 3:27
Scorpio Rising (Glasnostrology Mix) - 7:59
My Army of Lovers (Taj Mahal Dub) - 6:06

 12" maxi-single (France, 1990)
My Army of Lovers (Tour Du Monde Club Mix) - 8:27
My Army of Lovers (Radio Edit) - 3:27
My Army of Lovers (The Pisces Remix) - 5:25

 12" maxi-single (black sleeve) (UK, 1990)
My Army of Lovers (Concrete Ghetto Mix) - 8:27
My Army of Lovers (Tour Du Monde Club Mix) - 7:00
Scorpio Rising (Glasnostrology Mix) - 7:59

 12" maxi-single (white sleeve) (UK, 1990)
My Army of Lovers (The Pisces Remix) - 5:25
My Army of Lovers (Tour Du Monde Club Mix) - 7:00
Scorpio Rising (Glasnostrology Mix) - 7:59

 CD single (France, 1990)
My Army of Lovers - 3:27
Birds of Prey - 1:10
Ride the Bullet - 4:20
Scorpio Rising (Glasnostrology Mix) - 7:59

 CD maxi (U.S, 1991)
My Army of Lovers (Concrete Ghetto Mix) - 8:46
My Army of Lovers (Pisces Atmosphere Mix) - 5:23
My Army of Lovers (Nuzak Remix Club Edit) - 6:26
My Army of Lovers (Pisces Stratosphere Mix) - 5:51

References

1990 songs
1990 singles
Army of Lovers songs
English-language Swedish songs
Songs written by Tim Norell
Songs written by Alexander Bard
Songs written by Anders Hansson (songwriter)
Songs written by Peo Thyrén